Dina Panozzo is an Australian-born actress of Italian descent best known for her regular roles in the television series Carla Cametti PD and Bed of Roses. She has also appeared in a recurring role in Packed to the Rafters and guest roles in many Australian series including A Country Practice, Water Rats and White Collar Blue. Panozzo also had regular roles in the short-lived comedy series Wedlocked and soap opera Richmond Hill.

FILM

TELEVISION

STAGE/THEATRE
 Johnny Catillano (1976)
 Jack The Ripper (1976)
  II Magnifica (1979)
 Tales From Land Shut (1982)
 Don't Stand On Ceremony (1983)
 The Time Of Your Life (1984)
 A Touch Of Silk (1985)
 Beautland (1985)
 Exploring Shakespeare (1985)
 Big And Little Scenes (1986)
 Dreams In An Empty City (1986)
 Muse Of Fire (1986)
 On The Razzle (1987)
 The Imposter (1987)
 Peter Pan (1987)
 Richard III (1988)
 ABC (1988)
 Spanish Cuisine (1990)
 Sisters (1991)
 S.O.S. - Sex, Overkill And Salvation Of The Soul (1991)
 Love And Magic In Mama's Kitchen (1991)
 A Little Like Drowning (1992)
 Varda Che Bruta... Poretta (Look How Ugly She Is... Poor Thing) (1993)
 The Garden Of Granddaughters (1993)
 Belvoir Street Revues (1993)
 Emma (1998)

Personal life 
Dina Panozzo is the elder sister of actress Oriana Panozzo.

References

External links
 

Australian television actresses
Australian people of Italian descent
Living people
Year of birth missing (living people)